Russell McWhortor Cunningham (August 25, 1855 – June 6, 1921) was an American Democratic politician who was the acting Governor of Alabama from April 25, 1904, to March 5, 1905. He was lieutenant governor when Governor William D. Jelks fell ill and left the state for treatment, and since the Alabama Constitution requires that if the governor leave the state for more than 20 days, the lieutenant governor must act as governor until their return.

Although he was de jure only an interim chief of the state administration, because he served as Acting Governor for nearly a year, he is regarded as one of the Alabama Governor by the state government, and his portrait hanging along other Governor's portrait, as well as he figured on official state site alongside them. Cunningham is buried in Elmwood Cemetery.

Cunningham served in the Alabama House of Representatives 1880–1881. In 1896–1900, he served in the Alabama State Senate and was president of the senate. He also served in the Alabama Constitutional Convention of 1901.

Notes

External links

 

1855 births
1921 deaths
Democratic Party members of the Alabama House of Representatives
Democratic Party Alabama state senators
Democratic Party governors of Alabama
Lieutenant Governors of Alabama
People from Lawrence County, Alabama
Physicians from Alabama
Burials at Elmwood Cemetery (Birmingham, Alabama)